Kerne may refer to:

 Kerne or Kernev, Breton names for the historic region of Cornouaille, in Brittany, France
 Radio Kerne, a radio station in Brittany broadcasting in Breton
 Kerne Bridge, Herefordshire, England, UK; a bridge
 Kerne, a type of traditional Irish soldiery, see Rapparee

See also

 
 
 Hennadiy Kernes (1959–2020) Ukrainian politician
 Cerne (disambiguation)
 Kern (disambiguation)